Daughters of Pharmacist Kim is a 1963 South Korean film by Yu Hyun-mok portraying sibling rivalry and the troubled marriages of four sisters. In 2005, the film was adapted as an MBC television series.

Plot
The story of four daughters of a herb shopkeeper who faced tumultuous marriages with different lives.

Cast
Choi Ji-hee
Um Aing-ran
Hwang Jung-seun
Kim Dong-won
Gang Mi-ae
Hwang Hae
Park No-sik
Heo Jang-kang
Lee Min-ja
Shin Seong-il

References

External links
 
 

South Korean drama films
1963 drama films
1963 films
Films directed by Yu Hyun-mok